Muhammad Danial Amier bin Norhisham (born 27 March 1997) is a Malaysian professional footballer who plays as a central midfielder for Malaysia Super League club Johor Darul Ta'zim.

Club career

Early career
Danial Amier was born on 27 March 1997 and was raised in Sentul, Kuala Lumpur. He entered Sekolah Menengah Kebangsaan Victoria Institution in 2010  before transfer to Sekolah Sukan Negeri Wilayah Persekutuan SMK Seri Titiwangsa, Kuala Lumpur in 2012. Danial Amier began his football career in 2014 with a professional football club Frenz United. He was the captain of the club. In 2016, Frenz United has ceased to operate due to some problems.

Danial Amier stood low and did not play for 8 months after Frenz United ceased the club's operation in end of 2016. Danial Amier has contacted his former coach, Steve McMahon to help him find a new team. Danial also received an offer to play in Australia with Dunbar Rovers FC but on visa constraints, he was not able to play in Australia.

Felda United
In the 2017 season, Danial Amier signed with Felda United U21 team. Later of the season, Felda United 's former head coach, B. Sathianathan, promoted Danial Amier to the first team he was registered with the number 32 jersey, alongside Ali Imran Alimi. Danial Amier made his competitive debut for Felda United against Pahang on 26 April 2017 in the Super League, coming on as a 53rd-minute substitute for Azriddin Rosli in a 1–1 away draw.

Johor Darul Ta'zim

In 2021, Danial signed for Malaysia Super League  champions side Johor Darul Ta'zim upon of his expiration of his contract with Felda United. He makes his debut for the team in 3 - 0 win against Melaka United.

International career
Danial Amier began his international stage for Malaysia U-19 and made 2 appearances in the 2016 AFC U-19 Championship qualification.

On 21 July 2017, Danial Amier made his debut for Malaysia U-23 against Indonesia U-23 in 3–0 win in the 2018 AFC U-23 Championship qualification that was held in National Stadium, Bangkok, Thailand.

Danial Amier also was selected to play in 2017 Southeast Asian Games.

Career statistics

Club

International

Honours

Club 
Felda United
 Malaysia Premier League: 2018

International
Malaysia U-23
Southeast Asian Games  Silver Medal: 2017

References

External links
 

1997 births
Living people
People from Kuala Lumpur
Malaysian people of Malay descent
Sportspeople from Kuala Lumpur
Malaysian footballers
Johor Darul Ta'zim F.C. players
Malaysia Super League players
Association football midfielders
Southeast Asian Games silver medalists for Malaysia
Southeast Asian Games medalists in football
Competitors at the 2017 Southeast Asian Games
Competitors at the 2019 Southeast Asian Games
Malaysia youth international footballers